Ağçay or Agchay may refer to:

Ağçay, Khachmaz, Azerbaijan
Ağçay, Qakh, Azerbaijan
Sedat Ağçay, Turkish footballer

Turkish-language surnames